The Journal of Public Health is a quarterly peer-reviewed public health journal. It was originally established in 1892 as the Journal of State Medicine by the Royal Institute of Public Health and has undergone several renames during its history. It acquired its current name in 2004 and is currently published by Oxford University Press on behalf of the Faculty of Public Health. The editors-in-chief are Keith Neal and Premila Webster.

History
Journal of State Medicine (1892–1905)
Journal of Preventive Medicine (1905–1906)
Journal of the Royal Institute of Public Health (1907–1911)
Journal of State Medicine (1912–1937)
Journal of the Royal Institute of Public Health and Hygiene (1937–1963) (which also continues Journal of the Institute of Hygiene, London)
Royal Institute of Public Health and Hygiene Journal (1964–1968)
Community Health (1969–1978)
Community Medicine (1979–1989)
Journal of Public Health Medicine (1990–2003)
Journal of Public Health (2004–present)

Abstracting and indexing
The journal is abstracted and indexed in:
Abstracts on Hygiene and Communicable Diseases
CAB Abstracts
CINAHL
Current Contents/Clinical Medicine
Excerpta Medica Abstract Journals
PubMed
Science Citation Index
Tropical Diseases Bulletin
According to the Journal Citation Reports, the journal has a 2021 impact factor of 5.058.

References

External links 
 

Public health journals
Oxford University Press academic journals
Publications established in 1892
Quarterly journals
English-language journals